Michael Beecher  (20 November 1939 – 4 March 1993) was an Australian-based model and actor. He was the son of Rear Admiral Otto Humphrey Becher and Valerie Chisholme Baird.

Beecher had originally wanted to train and work as a diplomat.

His highest-profile role was as debonair hospital superintendent Dr. Brian Denham in Australian soap opera The Young Doctors, a role he played from the programme's inception in 1976 until leaving  the series (shortly before its demise) in 1982. Prior to The Young Doctors he had worked as a photographic model.

Filmography
Paradise (TV movie 1975)
Silent Number (TV series 1976)
Barnaby and Me (TV movie 1977)
The Outsiders (TV series 1977)
Bluey (TV series 1977)
Runaway Island (TV series 1982)
The Young Doctors (TV series 1976–1982)
The Haunted School (TV mini-series 1986) credited as Michael Becher
The Flying Doctors (TV series 1987) credited as Michael Becher

References

External links
 

1939 births
1993 deaths
Australian male television actors
20th-century Australian male actors